Grass Roots is an Australian television series produced by the Australian Broadcasting Corporation between 2000 and 2003.

Synopsis 
The series is set around the fictional Arcadia Waters Council (LGA) near Sydney, and was primarily a satirical look at the machinations of local government. It was written by Geoffrey Atherden.

Production
Part of the series was filmed in the inner west Sydney suburb of Concord. Many external shots of Arcadia waters Council chambers used Concord Council Chambers as a setting. The Council Chambers themselves (external shots, and the "Site Shed" Scenes, plus a couple of other external scenes were filmed in a Factory at the end of Mars Road Lane Cove. Other various locations around Concord, particularly in the shopping centre and cafes in Majors Bay Road were used. Beach scenes were filmed at Mona Vale, New South Wales on Sydney's northern beaches, while the location "Cemetery Point" was filmed at the Mona Vale headland reserve.

Series overview

Regular cast
 Geoff Morrell as Col Dunkley
 Zoe Carides as Liz Murray
 John Clayton as Harry Bond
 Rhondda Findleton as Karin Schumaker
 Sophie Heathcote (Season 1) and Jodie Dry (Season 2) as Biddy Marchant
 Sacha Horler as Helen Mansoufis (Season 1, Season 2 - 2 episodes)
 Rhys Muldoon as Greg Dominelli
 Chris Haywood as George Hasnakov
 Michael Craig as Gordon Mahon
 Sandy Gore as Salwah Mandinkis
 Matthew Newton (Season 1) as Derek Garner
 Lucy Bell (Season 2) as Emily Bell
 Pauline Chan (Season 1) and Theresa Wong (Season 2) as Irene Cheung
 Melissa Jaffer (Season 1) and Kerry Walker (Season 2) as Fran Smith
 Nicholas Papademetriou as Victor Trujillo
 Judi Farr as Janice Corniglio
 Tara Morice as Julie Dunkley
 Mary Coustas as Ava Strick (Season 2)
 John Gregg as Morgan Bartok
 Tammy MacIntosh as Marilyn Hennessy (Season 1)
 Peter Kowitz as Warwick Marchant
 Alan Cinis as Justin Thyer
 Mitchell Butel as Max Werring

Episodes

Season 1 (2000)

Season 2 (2003)

References

External links
 Official website (Season 1) – Archived
 Official website (Season 2) – Archived
 

2000 Australian television series debuts
2003 Australian television series endings
2000s Australian comedy television series
Australian political comedy television series
Television shows set in New South Wales
Australian Broadcasting Corporation original programming
Local government in New South Wales
Local government in Australia